Arturo Petrocelli (Naples, 1856- after 1916)  was an Italian painter, mainly of genre works.

He was the son of painter Vincenzo, and older brother of Achille Petrocelli. He first studied under his father.  Among his major works are: La colomba insidiata nel nido, Un bacio furtivo; Selvaggina; and Il giuoco delle Nocciuole (Neapolitan Costume scene, displayed at the Promotrice). He completed many still lifes and costume dramatizations, painting in pastel and water-colors.

References

1856 births
19th-century Italian painters
Italian male painters
20th-century Italian painters
Italian genre painters
Italian costume genre painters
Painters from Naples
Year of death missing
19th-century Italian male artists
20th-century Italian male artists